Pituca sin lucas (English title: Fancy Woman Without Money) is a Chilean romantic comedy television show created by Rodrigo Bastidas and Elena Muñoz, that premiered on Mega on October 13, 2014 and ended on May 25, 2015. Starring Paola Volpato and Alvaro Rudolphy, and directed by Patricio Gonzalez, Pablo Aedo, Felipe Arratia, and Mauricio Lucero, Pituca sin lucas was filmed by Chilefilms studios.

Pituca sin lucas is about a wealthy woman who, after being abandoned by her husband, must adjust to a new economic reality. She decides to live in a middle-class neighborhood where she finds love and emotional stability with a widower that works on a fish and seafood market. The story is set between La Dehesa in Lo Barnechea, one of the highest income neighborhoods of the Santiago Metropolitan Region, and Maipú, a middle class commune of the same region.

Plot 
The fall of Tichi Risopatrón has been brutal. Thunderous. Especially because this woman has never worked for anyone, nor is she a homemaker: she does not know how to cook, has never used a microwave and lives isolated from what happens in the real world. But her new status as a working and courageous woman helps her to become a new Tichi, one she never even knew existed: a strong woman that is able to support her family and do the unimaginable to provide for her young daughters. In fact, she doesn’t even have problems moving from her super mansion in La Dehesa to a semi-detached house in a middle-class neighborhood.

Can Tichi adapt to her new status, learn to work and avoid falling for her new neighbor, who attracts her so passionately? Can they give in to this budding love they are feeling? They can try to avoid fate, but nothing will change the destiny of these two clandestine lovers.

Cast 
Paola Volpato as María Teresa "Tichi, the Centolla" Achondo Amunategui de Risopatron
Álvaro Rudolphy as Manuel Gallardo Salinas
Íngrid Cruz as Stella "Reineta" González González / María Estela González "Peineta"
Mauricio Pesutic as José Antonio Risopatrón
Augusto Schuster as Fidel Gallardo Bastidas
Mariana di Girolamo as María Belén Risopatrón Achondo
Montserrat Ballarin as María Jesús Risopatrón Achondo
Francisco Puelles as Salvador Gallardo Bastidas
Fernanda Ramírez as Gladys Gallardo Bastidas
Ignacio Garmendia as Felipe Aldunate Correa
Fernando Godoy as Gregorio "Goyo" Cereceda
Otilio Castro as Enrique "Enrie-André" Andrade Chavez
Gabriela Hernández as Lita Amunátegui de Achondo
María de los Ángeles García as Margarita Bravo Saavedra
Fernando Farías as Benito Saavedra Aranguiz
Claudio Olate as Miguel Saez Pérez
Sofía Bennet as María Piedad "Pitita" Risopatrón Achondo
Benjamín Muñoz as Ernesto "Chechico" Gallardo Bastidas
Paulina Eguiluz as Margarita's Mother
Hernán Lacalle as Lawyer of Risopatron Family

Reception 
It was considered the most watched Chilean telenovela since 2006, reaching an average audience rating of 25.3 points and over 50% of the total share of Chilean television. It was considered an unprecedented success for Mega in the genre of fiction (usually dominated by Canal 13 and TVN).

Ratings

References

External links 
 

2014 telenovelas
2014 Chilean television series debuts
2015 Chilean television series endings
Chilean telenovelas
Spanish-language telenovelas
Mega (Chilean TV channel) telenovelas